Marco Liberi (c.1640 – after 1687) was an Italian painter of the Baroque period.  He was the son of the painter Pietro Liberi in Padua, and received his training under his father, whose style he imitated. He was active in Padua and Venice. He is known for cabinet paintings of allegorical, mythological and historical subjects.

Notes

References

Benezit, Emmanuel (2006). Benezit Dictionary Of Artists (Volume 8: Koort-Maekava). Grund. .

17th-century Italian painters
Italian male painters
Italian Baroque painters
Painters from Padua
Year of birth uncertain